Proprioseiopsis asetus is a species of mite in the family Phytoseiidae.

References

asetus
Articles created by Qbugbot
Animals described in 1959